Bluewell, West Virginia is an unincorporated census-designated place on U.S. Route 52 in Mercer County, West Virginia, United States. As of the 2010 census, its population is 2,184. It is the terminus of West Virginia Route 20.

The community has no post office, its residences being a part of Bluefield for postal purposes.  Its name is derived from being halfway between Bluefield and Bramwell.

The community is home to several businesses and establishments including Dish Network, Buffalo Trail Cabins and Restaurant and Lasting Impressions Flowers & Custom Gifts.

The community is adjacent to Pinnacle Rock State Park.

Educational institutions
 Bluewell Elementary

References

See also

 Southern West Virginia

Census-designated places in Mercer County, West Virginia
Census-designated places in West Virginia